Wynken, Blynken and Nod is a 1938 Silly Symphonies cartoon, adapted from Eugene Field's poem of the same name. Like other Symphonies at the time, it utilized the multiplane camera. It was directed by Graham Heid, produced by Walt Disney Productions, and distributed by RKO Radio Pictures. The three children bore similarities to Michael Darling in the 1953 Disney feature film, Peter Pan.

Plot
The three sleepy children sail in their shoe-boat; they stall briefly on a cloud, then have various troubles with their fishing lines. Nod lands a fish-like star that ends up squirming in his pants. A star hooks Wynken and Nod's candy-cane baited lines together. The stars tease Nod while he's hanging overboard. A meteor comes through; they catch it in a net and it tows them wildly, until they land in another cloud, where they are tossed by storms, eventually breaking their mast and sending them back to earth (and their bed, where it becomes clear that they are really just one boy).

Reception
In The Disney Films, Leonard Maltin says, "Wynken, Blynken and Nod is as extravagant as any Disney feature; it set a standard that was probably too extravagant to maintain, with most effort being turned toward feature-film production in the late 1930s. After 1940 these unique cartoons petered out of the Disney production schedule."

Voice cast
 Title song: Mary Moder

Home media
The short was released on December 4, 2001, on Walt Disney Treasures: Silly Symphonies - The Historic Musical Animated Classics.

References

External links 
 

1938 films
1938 short films
Silly Symphonies
1938 animated films
1930s Disney animated short films
Films produced by Walt Disney
Films based on poems
Animated films about children
Films about babies
Films scored by Leigh Harline
American black-and-white films
Animated films without speech
Films directed by Graham Heid
1930s American films